1743 in philosophy

Events 
 The American Philosophical Society (APS) was founded in 1743.

Births 
 William Paley (1743–1805).
 Thomas Jefferson (1743–1826). Liberal political philosopher.

References 

Philosophy
18th-century philosophy
Philosophy by year